Jeon Soo-hyun (born 18 August 1986) is a South Korean footballer who plays as a goalkeeper for Suwon FC in the K League 2.

External links 

1986 births
Living people
Association football goalkeepers
South Korean footballers
Jeju United FC players
Daejeon Hana Citizen FC players
Ansan Mugunghwa FC players
FC Anyang players
Suwon FC players
K League 1 players
K League 2 players
Sportspeople from Busan